Talk Is Cheap: Volume 1 is the 11th live spoken word album from Henry Rollins, released January 23, 2003 on 2.13.61 Records. The following night, Talk Is Cheap: Volume 2 was recorded at the same theater.

Track listing

Disc 1
 "Hello, I Am Old" - 13:58
 "Gyrlz2womyn" - 2:31
 "Boyz In the Adulthood" - 18:13
 "Getting It Together" - 2:48
 "Drowning In the Swim of Things" - 13:39
 "A River In Egypt" - 15:27
 "What We Know About You" - 4:18
 "Getting Snippy With It" - 6:48

Disc 2
 "Your Very Own Tank" - 17:43
 "I'd Be A Good Boss" - 21:01
 "I'd Be A Dead Boss" - 1:57
 "Classic Geographic" - 15:22

Credits
Randy Fransz - Recording
Rae Di Leo - Mixing
Dave Chapple - Design
Mike Curtis - Road Manager

References

2003 live albums
Henry Rollins live albums
Live spoken word albums
Live comedy albums
Spoken word albums by American artists
2.13.61 live albums